Indonesia and Romania established diplomatic relations in 1950. Indonesia and Romania have agreed to enhance cooperation in the trade sector. The nations are expecting the other to be the gate to enter each regional market: Indonesia as the gate to enter the ASEAN market and Romania as the gate to enter the European Union's. Indonesia has an embassy in Bucharest and Romania has an embassy in Jakarta.

The bilateral trade volume in 2012 was at US$172.67 million with balance in favour of Indonesia with export of US$106.41 million and import of US$66.25 million. Other than trade and economy, the bilateral relations includes culture, education, and technology.

See also 
 Foreign relations of Indonesia 
 Foreign relations of Romania

Notes

External links
Embassy of Indonesia in Bucharest, Romania
Embassy of Romania in Jakarta, Indonesia

 
Romania
Bilateral relations of Romania